Babice is a village in the administrative district of Gmina Krzywcza, within Przemyśl County, Subcarpathian Voivodeship, in south-eastern Poland.

The village has a population of 310.

References

Babice
Ruthenian Voivodeship
Kingdom of Galicia and Lodomeria
Lwów Voivodeship